Speed tape is an aluminium pressure-sensitive tape used to perform minor repairs on aircraft and racing cars. It is used as a temporary repair material until a more permanent repair can be carried out. It has an appearance similar to duct tape, for which it is sometimes mistaken, but its adhesive is capable of sticking on an airplane fuselage or wing at high speeds, hence the name.

Properties
Depending on the adhesive layer used, it can be resistant to water and solvents, flames for brief periods, and will reflect heat and UV light. It is also able to expand and contract through a wide range of temperatures.

Speed tape may be formed of soft aluminium with an adhesive layer, or a laminate of aluminium and cloth.

Use
Speed tape is sometimes used to protect sealant while curing, or to patch non-critical components of an aircraft. It can also be used for patching bullet damage to combat aircraft. 

Use of speed tape should be authorized by engineering teams and comply with certain requirements. Fines can be levied against airlines that use it to make improper repairs.

See also
 List of adhesive tapes

References

Adhesive tape
Aircraft components